Zaouiet Sousse is a town and commune in the Sousse Governorate, Tunisia. As of 2014 it had a population of 20,681.

It constitutes an agricultural village essentially centered on olive growing and cattle breeding. It is also a major producer of milk, transported from a collection center to the dairies of Sidi Bou Ali.

See also
List of cities in Tunisia

References

Populated places in Tunisia
Communes of Tunisia
Tunisia geography articles needing translation from French Wikipedia